Mahindra Armored Light Specialist Vehicle (also known as Mahindra ALSV or Mahindra LSV) is a light-weight four-wheel drive air transportable tactical armoured specialist vehicle designed by Mahindra & Mahindra for Indian Army and Indian Special Forces. It's a modular type vehicle built to be maintenance friendly, and can be upgraded and configured for wide range of roles.

History 
The vehicle is a derivative of Mahindra Axe. It is powered by a Steyr 3.2-litre, 6-cylinder turbodiesel engine which provides 215 hp at 3600 rpm with a peak torque of 500Nm. 

In March 2021, the company won a contract to supply 1,300 Light Specialist Vehicles (LSV) worth ₹1,056 crore to Indian Army.

Design
The Mahindra ALSV has been designed to comply with the Indian Army's future requirements of a Light Armored tactical vehicle. The ALSV comes in two variants - a 6 seater variant and an 8 seater variant. The ALSV offers ballistic protection up to CEN B7 STANAG Level II, which could stop a range of ammunitions including 7.62×51mm NATO caliber and heavy .50 BMG rounds. 

The ALSV offers ballistic protection against IEDs, hand grenades and anti personnel mines is ideally suited for patrolling in high intensity combat zones.

The vehicle has a Steyr 3.2-litre, 6-cylinder multi-fuel turbodiesel engine that develops 215HP at 3,600 rpm and a peak torque of 500Nm, mated to a four-speed automatic transmission. It has a load capacity of 400 kg.

Operators

Indian Army – Ordered 1300 LSVs to be inducted between 2021–2025.

 
UN Peacekeeping Forces (MONUSCO) – unknown number in active service

See also 
 Mahindra Axe
 Mahindra Marksman
Mahindra Rakshak

References

External links
 Official Site

Mahindra vehicles
Military vehicles of India
Military light utility vehicles